The 1882 Colorado College Tigers football team represented Colorado College during the 1882 college football season.

Schedule

References

Colorado College
Colorado College Tigers football seasons
College football undefeated seasons
Colorado College Tigers football